Arthur Njo-Léa (born 4 June 1996) is a Swiss professional footballer who plays as a winger or forward for Luxembourgish club Rodange.

Career
Njo-Léa started his career with Swiss Super League side Lausanne-Sport, where he made four league appearances. On 4 May 2014, he made his debut in a 3–1 defeat to FC Aarau.

Personal life
Njo-Léa is the grandson of former Cameroonian footballer Eugène N'Jo Léa, founder of the Union Nationale des Footballeurs Professionels, and the son of former footballer William N'Jo Léa.

References

1996 births
Living people
Swiss men's footballers
Swiss people of Cameroonian descent
Swiss sportspeople of African descent
Association football forwards
Association football wingers
FC Lausanne-Sport players
FC Le Mont players
R.E. Virton players
F.C.V. Dender E.H. players
FC Rodange 91 players
Swiss Super League players
Swiss Challenge League players
Belgian Third Division players
Luxembourg National Division players
Swiss expatriate footballers
Swiss expatriate sportspeople in France
Swiss expatriate sportspeople in Belgium
Swiss expatriate sportspeople in Luxembourg
Expatriate footballers in France
Expatriate footballers in Belgium
Expatriate footballers in Luxembourg